Royal Air Force Winkton or more simply RAF Winkton is a former Royal Air Force Advanced Landing Ground previously in Hampshire but now, due to County boundary changes, in Dorset, England.

Although complete by September 1943 Winkton opened in March 1944 with Sommerfeld Mesh runways and pierced steel planking perimeter tracks, and was the prototype for the type of temporary Advanced Landing Ground type airfield that would be built in France after D-Day, when the need for advanced landing fields would become urgent as the Allied forces moved east across France and Germany.  It was used by British, Dominion and the United States Army Air Forces.  It was closed in July 1944, when the mesh runways were lifted for use on the Continent, and immediately returned to agriculture.

Today the airfield is a mixture of agricultural fields with no recognizable remains.

History

USAAF use
While under USAAF control, Winkton was known as USAAF Station AAF-414 for security reasons, and by which it was referred to instead of location.   Its Station-ID was "WT", Radio-Callsign "Drainsink"

404th Fighter Group 
RAF Winkton saw the arrival of the USAAF 404th Fighter Group on 4 April 1944, the group arriving from Myrtle Beach AAF, South Carolina.   The 404th had the following operational squadrons:
 506th Fighter Squadron (4K)
 507th Fighter Squadron (Y8)
 508th Fighter Squadron (7J)

The 404th was a group of Ninth Air Force's 84th Fighter Wing, IX Tactical Air Command.  It flew the Republic P-47 Thunderbolt.  On 6 July the 404th moved across the Channel to its Advanced Landing Ground at Chippelle (ALG A-5), France.

Current use
With the Americans moving to France, Winkton airfield was closed down and returned to agricultural use in July 1944.  In January 1945, the airfield was officially closed.   Today, the land is unrecognizable as a former airfield, and can only be located by comparing the road network on aerial photographs taken when the airfield was active to the current network.

In 2009, there exists a private grass runway owned by Mr.I.C.Reid, who hangars his Tiger Moth biplane there.

See also

List of former Royal Air Force stations

References

Citations

Bibliography
 Freeman, Roger A. (1994) UK Airfields of the Ninth: Then and Now 1994. After the Battle 
 Freeman, Roger A. (1996) The Ninth Air Force in Colour: UK and the Continent-World War Two. After the Battle 
 Maurer, Maurer (1983). Air Force Combat Units Of World War II. Maxwell AFB, Alabama: Office of Air Force History. .

External links

 Built Only For Battle - The story of Station 414 of the 9th Air Force, Winkton ALG in Hampshire, United Kingdom
 New Forest Airfields - NFA2:Winkton ALG

Airfields of the IX Fighter Command in the United Kingdom
Military units and formations established in 1943
Military units and formations disestablished in 1945
Royal Air Force stations in Dorset
Royal Air Force stations in Hampshire